K. Geert Rouwenhorst is the Robert B. and Candice J. Haas  Professor at Yale School of Management and Deputy Director for International Financial Center at Yale. He is also a partner at SummerHaven Investment management. His work has traced the history of mutual funds through 18th century Netherlands. The International Financial Center at Yale also holds the oldest non-defaulted bond in the world.

His recent work with Gary B. Gorton has been influential in establishing the idea of commodities as an asset class and has fueled the rise of commodity indices and exchange-traded funds. He has studied the relative performance of futures and the underlying commodities.

Degrees
Ph.D. University of Rochester, 1991
MS University of Rochester, 1988
BLaw Erasmus University Rotterdam, Rotterdam, The Netherlands, 1986
MS Erasmus University Rotterdam, Rotterdam, The Netherlands, 1985

References

External links

Yale University faculty
Living people
21st-century American economists
University of Rochester alumni
Erasmus University Rotterdam alumni
American economics writers
20th-century American non-fiction writers
21st-century American non-fiction writers
American male non-fiction writers
Year of birth missing (living people)
20th-century American male writers
21st-century American male writers